The 1941 Great Yarmouth by-election was held on 8 April 1941.  The by-election was held due to the death of the incumbent Liberal National MP, Arthur Harbord.  It was won by the unopposed Liberal National candidate Percy Jewson.

References

1941 in England
Politics of the Borough of Great Yarmouth
1941 elections in the United Kingdom
By-elections to the Parliament of the United Kingdom in Norfolk constituencies
20th century in Norfolk
Unopposed by-elections to the Parliament of the United Kingdom (need citation)